The Palace of Placentia, also known as Greenwich Palace,
was an English royal residence that was initially built by Humphrey, Duke of Gloucester, in 1443. The palace was a pleasaunce; a place designed for pleasure, entertainment and an escape from the city. It was located at Greenwich on the south bank of the River Thames, downstream from London. On a hill behind the palace he built Duke Humphrey's Tower, later known as Greenwich Castle; it was subsequently demolished to make way for the Royal Observatory, Greenwich, which survives. The original river-side residence was extensively rebuilt around 1500 by Henry VII. A detached residence, the Queen's House, was built on the estate in the early 1600s and also survives.  In 1660, the main palace was demolished by Charles II to make way for a proposed new palace, which was never constructed. Nearly forty years later, the Greenwich Hospital (now called the Old Royal Naval College) was built on the site.

History

Humphrey was regent during the minority of Henry VI (his nephew) and started building the palace in 1433, under the name Bella Court. In 1447, Humphrey fell out of favour with Henry VI and was arrested for high treason. He died in prison, likely due to a stroke, though it was popularly believed that he was murdered (as is depicted in William Shakespeare's plays about Henry VI). Margaret of Anjou took over Bella Court, renaming it the Palace of Placentia, sometimes written as the 'Palace of Pleasaunce'.

In 1485, Edward IV gave land and property adjacent to the palace for the foundation of a friary by the Observant Friars (a branch of the Franciscans). The friars' church was used for royal baptisms and marriages, including the christenings of the future queens Mary I and Elizabeth I. However, the friars were persecuted during the English Reformation and finally expelled by Elizabeth I in 1559.

Henry VII rebuilt the palace between 1498 and 1504, with a design based around three large courtyards. It remained the principal royal palace for the next two centuries.

The palace was the birthplace of Henry VIII in 1491, and it figured largely in his life. Following the king's marriage to Catherine of Aragon, Placentia became the birthplace of  Mary I in 1516.

After Henry VIII's marriage to Anne Boleyn, his daughter, later Elizabeth I, was born at Placentia in 1533, and he married Anne of Cleves there in 1540. A fallen tree in Greenwich Park is known as Queen Elizabeth's Oak, in which she is reputed to have played as a child.

Both Mary and Elizabeth lived at Placentia for some years during the sixteenth century, but during the reigns of James I and Charles I, the Queen's House was erected to the south of the palace. Placentia fell into disrepair during the English Civil War, serving time as a biscuit factory and a prisoner-of-war camp.

In 1660, Charles II decided to rebuild the palace, engaging John Webb as the architect for a new King's House.  The only section of the new building to be completed was the east range of the present King Charles Court, but this was never occupied as a royal residence.  Most of the rest of the palace was demolished, and the site remained empty until construction of the Greenwich Hospital began in 1694.

Architecture 
The palace at Greenwich was built in the Tudor style. Although the structure is no longer standing, the size and design of Greenwich palace were said to be similar to that of Hampton Court which was built around the same time as Henry VII's rebuild of Placentia.

The original building was constructed primarily with brick and timber. The initial palace design had state apartments, a chapel, a five-story viewing tower, and two octagonal towers overlooking the tiltyard. The chapel, which was redone by Henry VIII, featured stained glass windows and black and white glazed tiles. The main face of the building looked out over the river Thames. It extended along 200m of the bank of the river and was accessible by boat. Piles from the original Tudor-era jetty remain today. Its red brick exterior showcased the monarchy's wealth as the material was expensive to manufacture and considered an extravagance. Aside from chapel renovations, Henry VIII also added an armoury, stables, and a banquet hall to the original palace.

During the early 17th century, as the palace was being rebuilt, Queen Anne of Denmark commissioned several buildings including the Queen’s House, three rooms along the garden, and a grotto aviary to be built in the gardens. The aviary was designed by Salome de Caus, a French architect and engineer. It was ornately decorated with pearls and shells and was covered in moss. The only surviving building of the 17th century additions to the palace is the Queen's House. This building, designed by architect Inigo Jones, is of particular architectural and historical significance as it is often credited as being the first classical building in England and was a clear departure from the Tudor style.

Archeological work in 2017 gave new insight into the architecture of the old palace. One of the more notable findings was lead glazed tile. These tiles were likely used as the flooring for the service areas such as the kitchen.

Modern era

The Greenwich Hospital complex became the Greenwich Royal Naval College in 1873, when the naval college was moved from Portsmouth. The buildings are today occupied by the University of Greenwich and the music faculty of Trinity Laban Conservatoire of Music and Dance.

Construction work for drains in late 2005 identified previously unknown Tudor remains.  A full archaeological excavation completed in January 2006 found the Tudor Chapel and Vestry with its tiled floor in situ. The vestry of the old palace was not demolished and later became the home of the treasurer of Greenwich Hospital.

During construction of the visitors’ centre for the painted hall in 2017, two more Tudor palace room were uncovered. One room contained bee holes for keeping hives in the winter. The other was believed to be part of the service range.

References

Further reading

External links

 
 

Buildings and structures completed in 1443
Houses completed in the 15th century
Former buildings and structures in the Royal Borough of Greenwich
Tudor royal palaces in England
Defunct prisons in London
Royal buildings in London
Royal residences in the Royal Borough of Greenwich
Royal residences in the United Kingdom
Country houses in London
15th-century architecture in the United Kingdom
Demolished prisons
Buildings and structures demolished in the 17th century